Novooleksandrivka is a village in Oleksandrivka Raion (district) in Donetsk Oblast of eastern Ukraine. The village borders in NW with Kharkiv Oblast.

External links
 Weather forecast for Novooleksandrivka

Villages in Kramatorsk Raion